The 2020 Home Tour 2 was the second staging of the Home Tour tournament organised by the Professional Darts Corporation for players to play indoor tournaments at their homes during the COVID-19 pandemic.

It began on 31 August 2020 and concluded on 20 October 2020. The tournament was open to the 70 lowest-ranked PDC Tour Card holders who entered, although the tournament also featured Top-32 players like Krzysztof Ratajski, Chris Dobey, Jonny Clayton, Stephen Bunting, Jermaine Wattimena, Jeffrey de Zwaan, Steve Beaton and Ricky Evans.

Luke Humphries was crown the 2020 Home Tour 2 champion, as he won the final Championship Group. In a high-class and tight affair he won ahead of Jonny Clayton on leg-difference, with five wins each. Damon Heta, who hit an 118.96 average during the Championship Group matches, the highest in both PDC Home Tours, finished third in the Championship Group.

Format
Beginning on 31 August 2020, seven Tour Card players would play against each other over the course of a day, with the top three from each day and the five best fourth-best players going into a last 35 stage, beginning on 30 September 2020.

In the second phase, the 35 players will again be put into groups of seven, where all players will play each other over one day. The top four in each group and the best fifth-placed player in the second phase will then move into a semi-final group stage taking place from 12 to 14 October, with the top two in each group and the best third-placed player moving forward to the Championship Group stage on 20 October, where the winner will become the champion.

In all phases, each match will be a best of 9 legs match, with the winner of each match getting two points on the table. Should there be a tie on points after all the matches, the leg difference will determine positions, should that also be equal, the result between the two players is taken into account. Should there be a three-way tie or more, the overall average of the players will then be taken into account.

Phase One
All matches first to 5 (best-of-9 legs)

NB: P = Played; W = Won; L = Lost; LF = Legs for; LA = Legs against; +/− = Plus/minus record, in relation to legs; Avg = Three-dart average in group matches; Pts = Group points

Group 1 – 31 August

Group 2 – 1 September

Group 3 – 2 September

Group 4 – 7 September

Group 5 – 8 September

Group 6 – 9 September

Group 7 – 21 September

Group 8 – 22 September

Group 9 – 23 September

Group 10 – 24 September

Ranking of fourth-placed players

Phase Two
All matches first to 5 (best-of-9 legs)

NB: P = Played; W = Won; L = Lost; LF = Legs for; LA = Legs against; +/− = Plus/minus record, in relation to legs; Avg = Three-dart average in group matches; Pts = Group points

Jamie Lewis and Devon Petersen have withdrawn, therefore Luke Woodhouse and Matthew Edgar qualified as the next best-performing fourth placed players in Phase One. 
Andy Hamilton withdrew due to a hand injury and was replaced by Alan Tabern.

Qualified players 

Group Winners
 Mickey Mansell
 Luke Humphries
 Jamie Lewis
 Nick Kenny
 Ryan Meikle
 Krzysztof Ratajski
 Mike De Decker
 Marko Kantele
 James Wilson
 Jonny Clayton

Group Runner-ups
 Ross Smith
 Kim Huybrechts
 Kai Fan Leung
 Kirk Shepherd
 Chris Dobey
 Jermaine Wattimena
 Andy Boulton
 Andy Hamilton
 Daniel Larsson
 Adam Hunt

Group Third
 Jeffrey de Zwaan
 Damon Heta
 Joe Murnan
 Steve Brown
 Bradley Brooks
 Martin Schindler
 Alan Tabern
 Stephen Bunting
 Gabriel Clemens
 Barrie Bates

Best Fourth
 Ron Meulenkamp
 Devon Petersen
 Carl Wilkinson
 Geert Nentjes
 Ted Evetts
 Luke Woodhouse
 Matthew Edgar

Group 1 – 29 September

Group 2 – 30 September

Group 3 – 5 October

Group 4 – 6 October

Group 5 – 7 October

Ranking of fifth-placed players

Phase Three
All matches first to 5 (best-of-9 legs)

NB: P = Played; W = Won; L = Lost; LF = Legs for; LA = Legs against; +/− = Plus/minus record, in relation to legs; Avg = Three-dart average in group matches; Pts = Group points

Qualified players 

Group Winners
 Andy Boulton
 Luke Humphries
 Jonny Clayton
 Carl Wilkinson
 Krzysztof Ratajski

Group Runner-ups
 Ross Smith
 Jermaine Wattimena 
 Ron Meulenkamp
 Bradley Brooks
 Kirk Shepherd

Group Third
 Chris Dobey
 James Wilson 
 Kai Fan Leung
 Joe Murnan
 Ryan Meikle

Group Fourth
 Damon Heta
 Kim Huybrechts 
 Marko Kantele
 Nick Kenny
 Gabriel Clemens
Best Fifth
 Luke Woodhouse

Group 1 – 12 October

Group 2 – 13 October

Group 3 – 14 October

Ranking of third-placed players

Championship Group (20 October)
All matches first to 5 (best-of-9 legs)

NB: P = Played; W = Won; L = Lost; LF = Legs for; LA = Legs against; +/− = Plus/minus record, in relation to legs; Avg = Three-dart average in group matches; Pts = Group points

Qualified players 

Group Winners
 Jonny Clayton
 Krzysztof Ratajski
 Damon Heta

Group Runner-ups
 Luke Humphries
 Kai Fan Leung
 Ross Smith

Best Third
 Ron Meulenkamp

Standings

References

Professional Darts Corporation tournaments
2020 in darts
PDC Home Tour